Onderbanken was a municipality in the southeastern Netherlands. In 2019, it merged with Nuth and Schinnen to form Beekdaelen.

Population centres 
Bingelrade, Douvergenhout, Etzenrade, Jabeek, Merkelbeek, Op den Hering, Quabeek, Raath, Schinveld, Viel.

Topography

Dutch Topographic map of the municipality of Onderbanken, June 2015.

References

External links

Official website

Beekdaelen
South Limburg (Netherlands)
Former municipalities of Limburg (Netherlands)
Municipalities of the Netherlands disestablished in 2019